The four-striped ground squirrel (Lariscus hosei) is a species of rodent in the family Sciuridae. It is endemic to Borneo. Its natural habitat is subtropical or tropical dry forests. It is threatened by habitat loss.

References

Thorington, R. W. Jr. and R. S. Hoffman. 2005. Family Sciuridae. Pp. 754–818 in Mammal Species of the World a Taxonomic and Geographic Reference. D. E. Wilson and D. M. Reeder eds. Johns Hopkins University Press, Baltimore.

Four-striped ground
Endemic fauna of Borneo
Mammals of Borneo
Rodents of Indonesia
Rodents of Malaysia
Mammals of Brunei
Taxonomy articles created by Polbot
Four-striped ground squirrel
Four-striped ground squirrel